Lyric Opera Virginia (LOV) is a not-for-profit professional opera and musical theater company based in the Commonwealth of Virginia in the United States. The LOV presents classical and contemporary opera and musical theater repertoire and trains promising young vocal and theater artists. Maestro Joseph Walsh is General and Artistic Director. LOV's 2011–2012 inaugural season featured Verdi's La Traviata starring Manon Strauss Evrard, Rodgers and Hammerstein's The King and I with Lisa Vroman and Kevin Gray, and an abridged production of Carmen with Magdelena Wor and Jonathan Burton. The 2012–2013 season included a Discovery Recital and Romeo and Juliet, featuring Cody Austin and Emily Duncan-Brown.  The 2013–2014 season will feature Viva Verdi!, Broadway and Beyond, La Vie De Boheme and Master Class by Terrence McNally.

The opera company has since closed its doors due to funding issues and is currently closed as of 2017.

External links 
Official website

Musical groups established in 2011
American opera companies
Fairfax County, Virginia
Culture of Norfolk, Virginia
Culture of Richmond, Virginia
Music of Virginia
Performing arts in Virginia
2011 establishments in Virginia